The High Sun is a 2015 Croatian drama film directed by Dalibor Matanić. It was screened in the Un Certain Regard section at the 2015 Cannes Film Festival winning the Jury Prize. It is the first Croatian film to be screened at Cannes since the country's independence in 1991. The film was selected as the Croatian entry for the Best Foreign Language Film at the 88th Academy Awards but it was not nominated.

Cast
 Tihana Lazović as Jelena / Nataša / Marija
 Goran Marković as Ivan / Ante / Luka
 Nives Ivanković as Jelena's / Nataša's mother
 Dado Ćosić as Saša / Dražen
 Stipe Radoja as Božo / Ivno
 Trpimir Jurkić as Ivan's / Luka's father
 Mira Banjac as Ivan's grandmother
 Slavko Sobin as Mane / Dino

See also
 List of submissions to the 88th Academy Awards for Best Foreign Language Film
 List of Croatian submissions for the Academy Award for Best Foreign Language Film

References

External links
 

2015 films
2015 drama films
Croatian drama films
2010s Croatian-language films
Films directed by Dalibor Matanić
Films set in 1991
Films set in 2001
Films set in 2011